WZZG (91.9 FM) was a radio station broadcasting a Contemporary Christian Music format, licensed to Toomsboro, Georgia, United States. The station served the Milledgeville, Georgia area and was owned by Augusta Radio Fellowship Institute, Inc.

The station's license was cancelled by the Federal Communications Commission on August 24, 2016, due to WZZG having been silent for more than twelve months (since March 12, 2015).

References

External links
WZZG's website
 

ZZG
Radio stations established in 2009
2009 establishments in Georgia (U.S. state)
Defunct radio stations in the United States
Radio stations disestablished in 2016
2016 disestablishments in Georgia (U.S. state)
Defunct religious radio stations in the United States
ZZG